Nizom Sangov (born June 26, 1983 in Temurmalik, Khatlon) is a Tajikistani weightlifter. Sangov represented Tajikistan at the 2008 Summer Olympics in Beijing, where he competed for the men's lightweight category (69 kg). Sangov placed twenty-fourth in this event, as he successfully lifted 115 kg in the single-motion snatch, and hoisted 135 kg in the two-part, shoulder-to-overhead clean and jerk, for a total of 250 kg.

References

External links

NBC 2008 Olympics profile

Tajikistani male weightlifters
1983 births
Living people
Olympic weightlifters of Tajikistan
Weightlifters at the 2008 Summer Olympics
Weightlifters at the 2010 Asian Games
Weightlifters at the 2014 Asian Games
Asian Games competitors for Tajikistan